Tin City FM (104.3 MHz) is a private radio station, located in Jos, Plateau State, Nigeria. It was founded by Rev. Fr. Martin Dama and began broadcasting in 2016.

References

Radio stations in Nigeria
2016 establishments in Nigeria
Radio stations established in 2016
Jos